Riccardo Del Turco (born September 7, 1939) is an Italian singer and songwriter, born in Fiesole. His song Luglio topped the Italian Hit Parade Singles Chart for two weeks in July 1968, selling over 500,000 copies. Luglios tune was marketed across Europe and was released in the UK as  I'm Gonna Try by The Tremeloes, but the song had a lukewarm response. The tune was then offered to the Herman's Hermits, who used it for their song, "Something's Happening". The song reached the sixth spot on the UK chart. Other international versions of Luglio include Joe Dassin's Le petit pain au chocolat, in French, and Huhta Bengt's (aka Kristian) Ai ai ai, in Finnish. More recently, Del Turco wrote the song "Vivo" that Andrea Bocelli recorded in 2018.

Discography

33 rpm 
 Riccardo Del Turco, 1969
 Tanto io non vinco mai, 1973

45 rpm 
 Le cose che non ci diciamo/La nostra casa, 1962
 M'hanno detto che/Dimmi se vuoi, 1964
 Parla di te/Non chiudere la porta, 1964
 Figlio unico/Quanto amore, 1966
 Uno tranquillo/Allora hai vinto tu, 1967
 L'importante è la rosa/Se è scritto nel cielo, 16 October 1967
 Luglio/Il temporale, 1968
 Cosa hai messo nel caffè/Commedia, 2 January 1969
 Il compleanno/Geloso, 23 aprile 1969
 Due biglietti perchè/Se non hai pensato, 1970
 Babilonia/Non ti voglio amare, 1970
 La cicala/Nel giardino dietro casa, 1971
 Uno, nessuno/La domenica ti penso di più, 1972
 Tanto io non vinco mai/L'appartamento, 1973
 Tanto io non vinco mai/La musica sta arrivando, 1973
 The Summer Of Mary Ann/Ramona, 1976
 Winter Flower/Sette e ventinove, 1979
 Non voglio ali/Noi due, 1982
 Serena alienazione/Spazio profondo, 1984

Filmography 
 Io non protesto, io amo, 1967
 Il professor Matusa e i suoi hippies, 1968

References

Italian male singers
Italian pop singers
Italian rock singers
Italian singer-songwriters
1939 births
Living people
Musicians from Florence